Horrell Creek is a stream in Cape Girardeau County in the U.S. state of Missouri. It is a tributary of Byrd Creek.

Horrell Creek derives its name from William Harrell, a local landowner.

See also
List of rivers of Missouri

References

Rivers of Cape Girardeau County, Missouri
Rivers of Missouri